Aste is a borough in Saaremaa Parish, near Kuressaare, Saare County in western Estonia. It was the site of the Soviet military Aste Airfield.

References

External links 
Satellite map at Maplandia.com

Boroughs and small boroughs in Estonia